Mason Independent School District is a public school district based in Mason, Texas (USA).   The district serves most of Mason County and extends into small portions of Kimble, McCulloch, Menard, and San Saba counties.

In 2009, the school district was rated "recognized" by the Texas Education Agency.

Schools
Mason High School (Grade 9-12) (the mascot is the Puncher, short for "cowpuncher" which is a slang name for cowboy; girls teams are called Cowgirls)
Mason Junior High (Grades 5-8)
Mason Elementary (Grades PK-4)

References

External links
Mason ISD

School districts in Mason County, Texas
School districts in Kimble County, Texas
School districts in McCulloch County, Texas
School districts in Menard County, Texas
School districts in San Saba County, Texas